The Zeitschrift des Deutschen Palästina-Vereins (English: Journal of the German Society for Exploration of Palestine) is a biannual peer-reviewed academic journal covering research on the cultural history of the Southern Levant. It is published by Harrassowitz Verlag on behalf of the German Society for the Exploration of Palestine. The editors-in-chief are Jens Kamlah, Achim Lichtenberger, and Markus Witte. The journal was established in 1878. Publication was suspended from 1946 to 1948, but re-started in 1949, when the title was changed to Beiträge zur biblischen Landes- und Altertumskunde. Only a single volume (#68) was produced in three issues until 1951 and publication was again suspended in 1952. From 1953 onwards the journal appeared under its original title.

Abstracting and indexing
The journal is abstracted and indexed in:
Arts and Humanities Citation Index
ATLA Religion Database
Current Contents/Arts & Humanities
Index Islamicus
L'Année philologique
Linguistic Bibliography
Scopus

References

External links

Middle Eastern studies journals
Palestine (region)
Publications established in 1878
Biannual journals
Multilingual journals
English-language journals
German-language journals
Harrassowitz Verlag academic journals